A kobold (occasionally cobold) is a mythical sprite. Having spread into Europe with various spellings including "goblin" and "hobgoblin", and later taking root and stemming from Germanic mythology, the concept survived into modern times in German folklore.

Although usually invisible, a kobold can materialize in the form of a non-human animal, a fire, a human, and a candle. The most common depictions of kobolds show them as humanlike figures the size of small children. Kobolds who live in human homes wear the clothing of peasants; those who live in mines are hunched and ugly and some can materialise into a brick; kobolds who live on ships smoke pipes and wear sailor clothing.

Legends tell of three major types of kobolds. Most commonly, the creatures are household spirits of ambivalent nature; while they sometimes perform domestic chores, they play malicious tricks if insulted or neglected. Famous kobolds of this type include King Goldemar, Heinzelmann, and Hödekin. In some regions, kobolds are known by local names, such as the Galgenmännlein of southern Germany and the Heinzelmännchen of Cologne. Another type of kobold haunts underground places, such as mines. A third kind of kobold, the Klabautermann, lives aboard ships and helps sailors.

Kobold beliefs are evidence of the survival of pagan customs after the Roman Catholicization of Germany, or merely that the legends of them have lived on as stories. Belief in kobolds dates to at least the 13th century, when German peasants carved kobold effigies for their homes. Such pagan practices may have derived from beliefs in the mischievous kobalos (pl. kobaloi) (Ancient Greek: Κόβαλος, plural: Κόβαλοι) of ancient Greece which was a sprite, a mischievous creature fond of tricking and frightening mortals, even robbing Heracles/Hercules. Greek myths depict the kobaloi as impudent, thieving, droll, idle, mischievous, gnome-dwarfs, and as funny, little tricksy elves of a phallic nature. Depictions of kobaloi are common in ancient Greek art. Other similar sprites include the household lares and penates of ancient Rome, or native German beliefs in a similar room spirit called kofewalt (whose name is a possible rootword of the modern kobold or a German dialectal variant). Kobold beliefs mirror legends of similar creatures in other regions of Europe, and scholars have argued that the names of creatures such as goblins and kabouters derive from the same roots as kobold. This may indicate a common origin for these creatures, or it may represent cultural borrowings and influences of European peoples upon one another. Similarly, subterranean kobolds may share their origins with creatures such as gnomes and dwarves and the aquatic Klabautermann with similar water spirits.

The name of the element cobalt comes from the creature's name, because medieval miners blamed the sprite for the poisonous and troublesome nature of the typical arsenical ores of this metal (cobaltite and smaltite) which polluted other mined elements.

Origins and etymology
The kobold's origins are obscure. Sources equate the domestic kobold with creatures such as the English boggart, hobgoblin and pixy, the Scottish brownie, and the Scandinavian nisse or tomte; while they align the subterranean variety with the Norse dwarf and the Cornish knocker. Irish historian Thomas Keightley argued that the German kobold and the Scandinavian nis predate the Irish fairy and the Scottish brownie and influenced the beliefs in those entities, but American folklorist Richard Mercer Dorson discounted this argument as reflecting Keightley's bias toward Gotho-Germanic ideas over Celtic ones.

Kobold beliefs represent the survival of pagan customs into the Roman Catholic and modern eras and offer hints of how pagan Europeans worshipped in the privacy of their homes. Religion historian Otto Schrader has suggested that kobold beliefs derive from the pagan tradition of worshipping household deities thought to reside in the hearth fire. Alternatively, Nancy Arrowsmith and George Moorse have said that the earliest kobolds were thought to be tree spirits. According to 13th-century German poet Conrad of Würzburg, medieval Germans carved kobolds from boxwood and wax and put them "up in the room for fun". Mandrake root was another material used. People believed that the wild kobold remained in the material used to carve the figure. One example, known as the monoloke, was made from white wax and wore a blue shirt and black velvet vest. The 17th century expression to laugh like a kobold may refer to these dolls with their mouths wide open, and it may mean "to laugh loud and heartily". These kobold effigies were stored in glass and wooden containers. German mythologist Jacob Grimm has traced the custom to Roman times and has argued that religious authorities tolerated it even after the Germans had been Christianised.

Several competing etymologies for kobold have been suggested. In 1908, Otto Schrader traced the word to kuba-walda, meaning "the one who rules the house". According to this theory, the root of the word is chubisi, the Old High German word for house, building, or hut, and the word akin to the root of the English 'cove'. The suffix -old means "to rule". Classicist Ken Dowden has identified the kofewalt, a spirit with powers over a single room, as the antecedent to the term kobold and to the creature itself. He has drawn parallels between the kobold and the Roman lares and penates and the Anglo-Saxon cofgodas, "room-gods". Linguist Paul Wexler has proposed yet another etymology, tracing kobold to the roots koben ("pigsty") and hold ("stall spirit").

Grimm has provided one of the earlier and more commonly accepted etymologies for kobold, tracing the word's origin through the Latin cobalus to the Greek koba'los, meaning "rogue". The change to the word-final -olt is a feature of the German language used for monsters and supernatural beings. Variants of kobold appear as early as the 13th century. The words goblin and gobelin, rendered in Medieval Latin as gobelinus, may in fact derive from the word kobold or from kofewalt. Related terms occur in Dutch, such as kabout, kabot, and kaboutermanneken. Citing this evidence, British antiquarian Charles Hardwick has argued that the house kobold and similar creatures, such as the Scottish bogie, French goblin, and English Puck, all descend from the Greek kobaloi, creatures "whose sole delite consists in perplexing the human race, and evoking those harmless terrors that constantly hover round the minds of the timid." In keeping with Grimm's definition, the kobaloi were spirits invoked by rogues. Similarly, British writer Archibald Maclaren has suggested that kobold beliefs descend from the ancient Roman custom of worshipping lares, household gods, and penates, gods of the house and its supplies.

Another class of kobold lives in underground places. Folklorists have proposed that the mine kobold derives from the beliefs of the ancient Germanic people. Scottish historical novelist Walter Scott has suggested that the Proto-Norse based the kobolds on the short-statured Finns, Lapps, and Latvians who fled their invasions and sought shelter in northern European caves and mountains. There they put their skills at smithing to work and, in the beliefs of the proto-Norse, came to be seen as supernatural beings. These beliefs spread, becoming the kobold, the Germanic gnome, the French goblin and the Scottish bogle. In contrast, Humorists William Edmonstoune Aytoun and Theodore Martin (writing as "Bon Gaultier") have proposed that the Norse themselves were the models for the mine kobold and similar creatures, such as dwarfs, goblins, and trolls; Norse miners and smiths "were small in their physical proportions, and usually had their stithies near the mouths of the mines among the hills." This gave rise to myths about small, subterranean creatures, and the stories spread across Europe "as extensively as the military migrations from the same places did".

German writer Heinrich Smidt believed that the sea kobolds, or Klabautermann, entered German folklore via German sailors who had learned about them in England. However, historians David Kirby and Merja-Liisa Hinkkanen dispute this, claiming no evidence of such a belief in Britain. An alternate view connects the Klabautermann myths with the story of Saint Phocas of Sinope. As that story spread from the Black Sea to the Baltic Sea. Scholar Reinhard Buss instead sees the Klabautermann as an amalgamation of early and pre-Christian beliefs mixed with new creatures.

Characteristics

Kobolds are spirits and, as such, part of a spiritual realm. However, as with other European spirits, they often dwell among the living. Although kobold is the general term, tales often give names to individuals and classes of kobolds. The name Chim is particularly common, and other names found in stories include Chimmeken, King Goldemar, Heinzchen, Heinze, Himschen, Heinzelmann, Hödekin, Kurd Chimgen, Walther, and Wolterken. Local names for kobolds include Allerünken, Alraune, Galgenmännlein (in southern Germany), Glucksmännchen, Heinzelmännchen (in Cologne), Hütchen, and Oaraunle. The Heinzelmännchen are a class of kobolds from Cologne, and the Klabautermann is a kobold from the beliefs of fishermen and sailors of the Baltic Sea. Many of these names are modifications of common German given names, such as Heinrich (abbreviated to Heinze), Joachim, and Walther.

Kobolds may manifest as non-human animals, fire, humans, and objects. Fiery kobolds are also called drakes, draches, or puks. A tale from the Altmark, recorded by Anglo-Saxon scholar Benjamin Thorpe in 1852, describes the kobold as "a fiery stripe with a broad head, which he usually shakes from one side to the other ...". A legend from the same period taken from Pechüle, near Luckenwald, says that the kobold flies through the air as a blue stripe and carries grain. "If a knife or a fire-steel be cast at him, he will burst, and must let fall what which he is carrying." Some legends say the fiery kobold enters and exits a house through the chimney. Legends dating to 1852 from western Uckermark ascribe both human and fiery features to the kobold; he wears a red jacket and cap and moves about the air as a fiery stripe. Such fire associations, along with the name drake, may point to a connection between kobold and dragon myths.

Kobolds who live in human homes are generally depicted as humanlike, dressed as peasants, and standing about as tall as a four-year-old child. A legend recorded by folklorist Joseph Snowe from a place called Alte Burg in 1839 tells of a creature "in the shape of a short, thick-set being, neither boy nor man, but akin to the condition of both, garbed in a party-coloured loose surcoat, and wearing a high-crowned hat with a broad brim on his diminutive head." The kobold Hödekin (also known as Hüdekin and Hütchen) of Hildesheim wore a little hat down over his face (Hödekin means "little hat"). Yet other tales describe kobolds appearing as herdsmen looking for work and little, wrinkled old men in pointed hoods. Some kobolds resemble small children. According to dramatist and novelist X. B. Saintine, kobolds are the spirits of dead children and often appear with a knife that represents the means by which they were put to death. Heinzelmann, a kobold from the folklore of Hudermühlen Castle in the region of Lüneburg, appeared as a beautiful boy with blond, curly hair to his shoulders and dressed in a red silk coat. His voice was "soft and tender like that of a boy or maiden."

Legends variously describe mine kobolds as 0.6 metre-tall (2-ft) old men dressed like miners to short, bent creatures with "ugly" features, including, in some tales, black skin. In 1820, Spiritualist Emma Hardinge Britten recorded a description of mine kobolds from a Madame Kalodzy, who stayed with peasants named Dorothea and Michael Engelbrecht:

We were about to sit down to tea when Mdlle. Gronin called our attention to the steady light, round, and about the size of a cheese plate, which appeared suddenly on the wall of the little garden directly opposite the door of the hut in which we sat.Before any of us could rise to examine it, four more lights appeared almost simultaneously, about the same shape, and varying only in size. Surrounding each one was the dim outline of a small human figure, black and grotesque, more like a little image carved out of black shining wood, than anything else I can liken them to. Dorothea kissed her hands to these dreadful little shapes, and Michael bowed with great reverence. As for me and my companions, we were so awe-struck yet amused at these comical shapes, that we could not move or speak until they themselves seemed to flit about in a sort of wavering dance, and then vanish, one by one.

The same informant claimed to later have seen the kobolds first-hand. She described them as "diminutive black dwarfs about two or three feet in height, and at that part which in the human being is occupied by the heart, they carry the round luminous circle first described, an appearance which is much more frequently seen than the little black men themselves." The Heinzelmännchen of Cologne resemble short, naked men, and the Klabautermann, a kobold from the beliefs of fishermen and sailors of the Baltic Sea, typically appears as a small, pipe-smoking humanlike figure wearing a yellow nightcap-style sailor's hat and a red or grey jacket.

Other kobolds appear as non-human animals. Folklorist D. L. Ashliman has reported kobolds appearing as wet cats and hens, and Arrowsmith and Moorse mention kobolds in the shape of bats, cats, roosters, snakes, and worms. Thorpe has recorded that the people of Altmark believed that kobolds appeared as black cats while walking the earth. The kobold Heinzelmann could appear as a black marten and a large snake.

Most often, kobolds remain completely invisible. Although King Goldemar (or Goldmar), a famous kobold from Castle Hardenstein, had hands "thin like those of a frog, cold and soft to the feel", he never showed himself. The master of Hundermühlen Castle, where Heinzelmann lived, convinced the kobold to let him touch him one night. The kobold's fingers were childlike, and his face was like a skull, without body heat. One legend tells of a female servant taking a fancy to her house's kobold and asking to see him. The kobold refuses, claiming that to look upon him would be terrifying. Undeterred, the maid insists, and the kobold tells her to meet him later—and to bring along a pail of cold water. The kobold waits for the maid, nude and with a butcher knife in his back. The maid faints at the sight, and the kobold wakes her with the cold water. In one variant, the maid sees a dead baby floating in a cask full of blood; years before, the woman had born a bastard child, killed it, and hidden it in such a cask. Legends tell of those who try to trick a kobold into showing itself being punished for the misdeed. For example, Heinzelmann tricked a nobleman into thinking that the kobold was hiding in a jug. When the nobleman covered the jug's mouth to trap the creature, the kobold chided him:

If I had not heard long ago from other people that you were a fool, I might now have known it of myself, since you thought I was sitting in an empty jug, and went to cover it up with your hand, as if you had me caught. I don't think you worth the trouble, or I would have given you, long since, such a lesson, that you should remember me long enough. But before long you will get a slight ducking.

When a man threw ashes and tares about to try to see King Goldemar's footprints, the kobold cut him to pieces, put him on a spit, roasted him, boiled his legs and head, and ate him. The Heinzelmänchen of Cologne marched from the city and sailed away when a tailor's wife strewed peas on the stairs to trip them so she could see them. In 1850, Keightley noted that the Heinzelmänchen "[had] totally disappeared, as has been everywhere the case, owing to the curiosity of people, which has at all times been the destruction of so much of what was beautiful in the world."

House spirits

Domestic kobolds are linked to a specific household. Some legends claim that every house has a resident kobold, regardless of its owners' desires or needs. The means by which a kobold enters a new home vary from tale to tale. One tradition claims that the kobold enters the household by announcing itself at night by strewing wood chips about the house and putting dirt or cow manure in the milk cans. If the master of the house leaves the wood chips and drinks the soiled milk, the kobold takes up residence. The kobold Heinzelmann of Hundermühlen Castle arrived in 1584 and announced himself by knocking and making other sounds. Should someone take pity on a kobold in the form of a cold, wet creature and take it inside to warm it, the spirit takes up residence there. A tradition from Perleberg in northern Germany says that a homeowner must follow specific instructions to lure a kobold to their house. They must go on St John's Day between noon and one o'clock, into the forest. When they find an anthill with a bird on it, they must say a certain phrase, which causes the bird to transform into a small human. The figure then leaps into a bag carried by the homeowner, and they can then transfer the kobold to their home. Even if servants come and go, the kobold stays.

House kobolds usually live in the hearth area of a house, although some tales place them in less frequented parts of the home, in the woodhouse, in barns and stables, or in the beer cellar of an inn. At night, such kobolds do chores that the human occupants neglected to finish before bedtime: They chase away pests, clean the stables, feed and groom the cattle and horses, scrub the dishes and pots, and sweep the kitchen. Other kobolds help tradespeople and shopkeepers. A Cologne legend recorded by Keightley claims that bakers in the city in the early 19th century never needed hired help because, each night, the kobolds known as Heinzelmänchen made as much bread as a baker could need. Similarly, biersal, kobolds who live in breweries and the beer cellars of inns or pubs, bring beer into the house, clean the tables, and wash the bottles, glasses and casks. One such legend, first appearing late in the 19th century, concerns a house spirit named Hödfellow that resided at the Fremlin's Brewery in Maidstone, Kent, England who was wont to either assist the company's workers or hinder their efforts depending on whether he was being paid his share of the beer. This association between kobolds and work gave rise to a saying current in 19th-century Germany that a woman who worked quickly "had the kobold".

A kobold can bring wealth to his household in the form of grain and gold. In this function it often is called Drak. A legend from Saterland and East Friesland, recorded by Thorpe in 1852, tells of a kobold called the Alrûn. Despite standing only about a foot tall, the creature could carry a load of rye in his mouth for the people with whom he lived and did so daily as long as he received a meal of biscuits and milk. The saying to have an Alrûn in one's pocket means "to have luck at play". However, kobold gifts may be stolen from the neighbours; accordingly, some legends say that gifts from a kobold are demonic or evil. Nevertheless, peasants often welcome this trickery and feed their kobold in the hopes that it continue bringing its gifts. A family coming into unexplained wealth was often attributed to a new kobold moving into the house.

Kobolds bring good luck and help their hosts as long as the hosts take care of them. The kobold Heinzelmann found things that had been lost. He had a rhyme he liked to sing: "If thou here wilt let me stay, / Good luck shalt thou have alway; / But if hence thou wilt me chase, / Luck will ne'er come near the place." Three famous kobolds, King Goldemar, Heinzelmann, and Hödekin, all gave warnings about danger to the owners of the home in which they lived. Heinzelmann once warned a colonel to be careful on his daily hunt. The man ignored the advice, only to have his gun backfire and shoot off his thumb. Heinzelman appeared to him and said, "See, now, you have got what I warned you of! If you had refrained from shooting this time, this mischance would not have befallen you." The kobold Hödekin, who lived with the bishop of Hildesheim in the 12th century, once warned the bishop of a murder. When the bishop acted on the information, he was able to take over the murderer's lands and add them to his bishopric.

In return, the family must leave a portion of their supper (or beer, for the biersal—see Hödfellow) to the spirit and must treat the kobold with respect, never mocking or laughing at the creature. A kobold expects to be fed in the same place at the same time each day, or in the case of the Hütchen, once a week and on holidays. One tradition says that their favourite food is grits or water-gruel. Tales tell of kobolds with their own rooms; the kobold Heinzelmann had his own chamber at the castle, complete with furnishings. and King Goldemar was said to sleep in the same bed with Neveling von Hardenberg. He demanded a place at the table and a stall for his horses. Keightley relates that maids who leave the employ of a certain household must warn their successor to treat the house kobold well.

Legends tell of slighted kobolds becoming quite malevolent and vengeful, afflicting errant hosts with supernatural diseases, disfigurements, and injuries. Their pranks range from beating the servants to murdering those who insult them. One holyman visited the home of Heinzelmann and refused to accept the kobold's protests that he was a Christian. Heinzelmann threatened him, and the nobleman fled. Another nobleman refused to drink to the kobold's honour, which prompted Heinzelmann to drag the man to the ground and choke him near to death. When a kitchen servant got dirt on the kobold Hödekin and sprayed him with water each time he appeared, Hödekin asked that the boy be punished, but the steward dismissed the behaviour as a childish prank. Hodeken waited for the servant to go to sleep and then strangled him, tore him limb from limb, and threw him in a pot over the fire. The head cook rebuked the kobold for the murder, so Hodeken squeezed toad blood onto the meat being prepared for the bishop. The cook chastised the spirit for this behaviour, so Hodeken threw him over the drawbridge into the moat. According to Lüthi, these abilities reflect the fear of the people who believe in them. Thomas Keightley has attributed the feats of kobolds to "ventriloquism and the contrivances of servants and others."

Archibald Maclaren has attributed kobold behaviour to the virtue of the homeowners; a virtuous house has a productive and helpful kobold; a vice-filled one has a malicious and mischievous pest. If the hosts give up those things to which the kobold objects, the spirit ceases its annoying behaviour. Heinzelmann punished vices; for example, when the secretary of Hudenmühlen was sleeping with the chamber maid, the kobold interrupted a sexual encounter and hit the secretary with a broom handle. King Goldemar revealed the secret transgressions of clergymen, much to their chagrin. Joseph Snowe has related the tale of a kobold at Alte Burg: When two students slept in the mill in which the creature lived, one of them ate the offering of food the miller had left the kobold. The student who had left the meal alone felt the kobold's touch as "gentle and soothing", but the one who had eaten its food felt that "the fingers of the hand were pointed with poisoned arrowheads, or fanged with fire." Even friendly kobolds are rarely completely good, and house kobolds may do mischief for no particular reason. They hide things, push people over when they bend to pick something up, and make noise at night to keep people awake. The kobold Hödekin of Hildesheim roamed the walls of the castle at night, forcing the watch to be constantly vigilant. A kobold in a fishermen's house in Köpenick on the Wendish Spree reportedly moved sleeping fishermen so that their heads and toes lined up. King Goldemar enjoyed strumming the harp and playing dice. One of Heinzelmann's pranks was to pinch drunken men to make them start fights with their companions. Heinzelmann liked his lord's two daughters and scared away their suitors so that the women never married.

Folktales tell of people trying to rid themselves of mischievous kobolds. In one tale, a man with a kobold-haunted barn puts all the straw onto a cart, burns the barn down, and sets off to start anew. As he rides away, he looks back and sees the kobold sitting behind him. "It was high time that we got out!" it says. A similar tale from Köpenick tells of a man trying to move out of a kobold-infested house. He sees the kobold preparing to move too and realises that he cannot rid himself of the creature. The lord of the Hundermühlen Castle disliked Heinzelmann and tried to escape him by taking up residence with his family and retinue elsewhere. Nevertheless, the invisible kobold travelled along with them as a white feather, which they discovered when they stayed at an inn.

Why do you retire from me? I can easily follow you anywhere, and be where you are. It is much better for you to return to your own estate, and not be quitting it on my account. You see well that if I wished it I could take away all you have, but I am not inclined to do so.

Exorcism by a Christian priest works in some tales; the bishop of Hildesheim managed to exorcise Hödekin from the castle. Even this method is not fool-proof, however; when an exorcist tried to drive away Heinzelmann, the kobold tore up the priest's holy book, strewed it about the room, attacked the exorcist, and chased him away. Insulting a kobold may drive it away, but not without a curse; when someone tried to see his true form, Goldemar left the home and vowed that the house would now be as unlucky as it had been fortunate under his care. Actions a Hütchen considers insulting include giving him clothing, rushing him in his work, burning the house down, and leaving a wagon wheel in front of it.

Mine spirits
Medieval European miners believed in underground spirits. The kobold filled this role in German folklore and is similar to other creatures of the type, such as the English bluecap, Cornish knocker and the Welsh coblynau. Stories of subterranean kobolds were common in Germany by the 16th century. Superstitious miners believed the creatures to be expert miners and metalworkers who could be heard constantly drilling, hammering, and shoveling. Some stories claim that the kobolds live in the rock, just as human beings live in the air.

Legends often paint underground kobolds as evil creatures. In medieval mining towns, people prayed for protection from them. They were blamed for the accidents, cave-ins, and rock slides that plagued human miners. One favoured kobold prank was to fool miners into taking worthless ore. For example, 16th-century miners sometimes encountered what looked to be rich veins of copper or silver, but which, when smelted, proved to be little more than a pollutant and could even be poisonous. These ores caused a burning sensation to those who handled them. Miners tried to appease the kobolds with offerings of gold and silver and by insisting that fellow miners treat them respectfully. Nevertheless, some stories claim that kobolds only returned such kindness with more poisonous ores. Miners called these ores cobalt after the creatures from whom they were thought to come. In 1735, Swedish chemist Georg Brandt isolated a substance from such ores and named it cobalt rex. In 1780, scientists showed that this was in fact a new element, which they named cobalt.

Tales from other parts of Germany make mine kobolds beneficial creatures, at least if they are treated respectfully. Nineteenth-century miners in Bohemia and Hungary reported hearing knocking in the mines. They interpreted such noises as warnings from the kobolds to not go in that direction. Other miners claimed that the knocks indicated where veins of metal could be found: the more knocks, the richer the vein. In 1884, spiritualist Emma Hardinge Britten reported a story from a Madame Kalodzy, who claimed to have heard mine kobolds while visiting a peasant named Michael Engelbrecht: "On the three first days after our arrival, we only heard a few dull knocks, sounding in and about the mouth of the mine, as if produced by some vibrations or very distant blows..." Kobolds are sometimes portrayed as being indifferent to human miners, so long as they are left alone. In these depictions, they are content to simply mine ore themselves, collect it, and haul it away by windlass.

Water spirits

The Klabautermann (also spelt Klaboterman and Klabotermann) is a creature from the beliefs of fishermen and sailors of Germany's north coast, the Netherlands, and the Baltic Sea, and may represent a third type of kobold or possibly a different spirit that has merged with kobold traditions. Belief in the Klabautermann dates to at least the 1770s. According to these traditions, Klabautermanns live on ships and are generally beneficial to the crew. For example, a Klabautermann will pump water from the hold, arrange cargo, and hammer at holes until they can be repaired. The creatures are thought to be especially useful in times of danger, preventing the ship from sinking. The Klabautermann is associated with the wood of the ship on which it lives. It enters the ship via the wood used to build it, and it may appear as a ship's carpenter.

The Klabautermann's benevolent behaviour lasts as long as the crew and captain treat the creature respectfully. A Klabautermann will not leave its ship until it is on the verge of sinking. To this end, superstitious sailors in the 19th century demanded that others pay the Klabautermann respect. Ellett has recorded one rumour that a crew even threw its captain overboard for denying the existence of the ship's Klabautermann. Heinrich Heine has reported that one captain created a place for his ship's Klabautermann in his cabin and that the captain offered the spirit the best food and drink he had to offer. Klabautermanns are easily angered. Their ire manifests in pranks such as tangling ropes and laughing at sailors who shirk their chores.

The sight of a Klabautermann is an ill omen, and in the 19th century, it was the most feared sight among sailors. According to one tradition, they only appear to those about to die. Another story recorded by Ellett claims that the Klabautermann only shows itself if the ship is doomed to sink.

In media
German writers have long borrowed from German folklore and fairy lore for both poetry and prose. Narrative versions of folktales and fairy tales are common, and kobolds are the subject of several such tales. Kobolds appear in a number of other works. For example, in his Bible, Martin Luther translates the Hebrew lilith in Isaiah 34:14 as kobold. In Johann Wolfgang von Goethe's Faust, the kobold represents the Greek element of earth:

Similarly, a kobold is musically depicted in Edvard Grieg's lyric piece, opus 71, number 3. Likewise, kobold characters such as Pittiplatsch and Pumuckl appear in German popular culture. Der Kobold, Op. 3, is also Opera in Three Acts with text and music by Siegfried Wagner; his third opera and it was completed in 1903.

Kobolds also appear in many modern fantasy-themed games like Clash of Clans, usually as a low-power or low-level enemy. They exist as a playable race in the Dark Age of Camelot video game. They also exist as a non-playable race in the World of Warcraft video game series, and also feature in tabletop games such as Magic: The Gathering. In Dungeons & Dragons, the kobold appears as an occasionally playable race of lizard-like beings. In Might and Magic games (notably Heroes VII), they are depicted as being mouse-dwarf hybrids. The anime franchise Record of Lodoss War depicts kobolds as dog-like based on earlier versions of Dungeons & Dragons, resulting in many Japanese media depictions doing the same.

In the novel American Gods, by Neil Gaiman, Heinzelmann is portrayed as an ancient kobold who helps the city of Lakeside by killing one teenager once a year.

See also
 Gremlin
 Kobold (Dungeons & Dragons)
 Niß Puk, the kobold of Northern Germany

Notes

References

 Angus, Charlie, and Brit Griffin (1996). We Lived a Life and Then Some: The Life, Death, and Life of a Mining Town. Between the Lines. .
 Arrowsmith, Nancy, and George Moorse (1977). A Field Guide to the Little People. London: Pan Macmillan. .
 Ashliman, D. L. (2006). Fairy Lore: A Handbook. Greenwood Press. .
 Baring-Gould, S. (2004 [1913]). A Book of Folklore. Kessinger Publishing. .
 Britten, Emma Hardinge (2003 [1884]). Nineteenth Century Miracles and Their Work in Every Country of the Earth. Kessinger Publishing. .
 Bunce, John Thackray (2004 [1878]). Fairy Tales: Their Origin and Meaning. Kessinger Publishing. .
 Commodity Research Bureau (2005). "Cobalt", The CRB Commodity Yearbook 2004. John Wiley and Sons. .
 "Cove". Merriam-Webster OnLine. Retrieved 10 January 2008.
 Daintith, John (1994). "BRANDT, Georg", Biographical Dictionary of Scientists, 2nd ed. Vol. 1. New York: Taylor & Francis Group, L.L.C. .
 Dorson, Richard Mercer (1999). History of British Folklore, Volume I: The British Folklorists: A History. Taylor & Francis. .
 Dowden, Ken (2000). European Paganism: The Realities of Cult from Antiquity to the Middle Ages. London: Routledge. .
 Eagleson, Mary (1994). "Cobalt", Concise Encyclopedia: Chemistry. Walther de Gruyter. .
 Ellett, Mrs. (January 1846). "Traditions and Superstitions", The American Whig Review: A Whig Journal, Vol. III. New York: George H. Colton.
"Fairy of the Mine", The London Encyclopædia, or Universal Dictionary of Science, Art, Literature, and Practical Mechanics, Comprising a Popular View of the Present State of Knowledge, Vol IX. 1829. London: Thomas Tegg.
 Gaultier, Bon (1852). "Influence of Place on Race", Graham's Magazine, Vol 41. G. R. Graham. pp. 360–369.
 Gostwick, Joseph (1849). "Redmantle", German Literature. Edinburgh: William and Robert Chambers.
 Grimm, Jacob (2003 [1883]). Teutonic Mythology, Part 2. Kessinger Publishing. .
 Hardwick, Charles (1980 [1872]). Traditions, Superstitions, and Folk-lore. Lancanshire: Ayer Publishing. .
 Heine, Heinrich, Helen Mustard, trans. (1985 [1835]). "Concerning the History of Religion and Philosophy in Germany", The Romantic School and Other Essays. New York: Continuum. .
 "Isaiah 34:14: Parallel Translations", Biblos.com. Retrieved 8 November 2007.
 Jameson, Robert (1820). System of Mineralogy: In Which Minerals Are Arranged According to the Natural History Method. A. Constable.
 Jeffrey, David Lyle, ed. (1992). A Dictionary of Biblical Tradition in English Literature. Grand Rapids, Michigan: Wm. B. Eerdmans Publishing Co. .
 Keightley, Thomas (1850). The Fairy Mythology, Illustrative of the Romance and Superstition of Various Countries. London: H. G. Bohn.
 Kirby, David, and Merja-Liisa Hinkkanen (2000). The Baltic and the North Seas. London: Routledge. .
 Liddell, Henry George, and Robert Scott (1940). A Greek-English Lexicon, revised and augmented throughout by Sir Henry Stuart Jones with the assistance of Roderick McKenzie. Oxford: Clarendon Press. . Online version Retrieved 25 February 2008.
 Lurker, Manfred (2004). The Routledge Dictionary of Gods and Goddesses, Devils and Demons. London: Routledge. .
 Lüthi, Max (1986). The European Folktale: Form and Nature. Indianapolis: Indiana University Press. .
 Maclaren, Archibald (1857). The Fairy Family: A Series of Ballads & Metrical Tales Illustrating the Fairy Mythology of Europe. London: Longman, Brown, Green, Longmans, & Roberts.
 Moore, Edward (1847), editor Thomas Heywood. The Moore Rental. Manchester: Charles Simms and Co.
 Morris, Richard (2003). The Last Sorcerers: The Path from Alchemy to the Periodic Table. Joseph Henry Press. .
 "Popular Legends and Fictions XII: British Popular Mythology", The Saturday Magazine, Vol. 10. 26 August 1837. London: John William Parker West Strand.
 Rose, Carol (1996). Spirits, Fairies, Leprechauns, and Goblins: An Encyclopedia. New York City: W. W. Norton & Company, Inc. .
 Saintine, X. B. (1862). La Mythologie du Rhin. Paris: Librairie de L. Hachette et Cie.
 Schrader, Otto (2003 [1908]). "Aryan Religion", Encyclopedia of Religion and Ethics Part 3. Kessinger Publishing. .
 Scott, Walter (1845). "Letter IV", Letters on Demonology and Witchcraft. New York: Harber & Brothers.
 Snowe, Joseph (1839). The Rhine, Legends Traditions, History, from Cologne to Mainz. London: F. C. Westley and J. Madden & Co.
 Thorpe, Benjamin (1852). Northern Mythology, Comparing the Principal Popular Traditions and Superstitions of Scandinavia, North Germany, and the Netherlands, Vol III. London: Edward Lumley.
 Weeks, Mary Elvira (2003 [1934]). "Elements Known to the Alchemists", Discovery of the Elements. Kessinger Publishing. .
 Wexler, Paul (2002). Trends in Linguistics: Two-tiered Relexification in Yiddish: Jews, Sorbs, Khazars, and the Kiev-Polessian Dialect. Walter de Gruyter. .

Fairies
 
Tutelary deities
Goblins
Pixies
Gnomes
Elves
Mining folklore
German legendary creatures
Household deities
Sprites (folklore)